Guskov or Huskov (Cyrillic: Гуськов) is a Russian masculine surname originating from gus, meaning goose; its feminine counterpart is Guskova or Huskova. Notable people with the name include:

Aleksandr Guskov (born 1976), Russian ice hockey defenceman 
Aleksei Guskov (born 1958), Russian actor and producer
Andrei Guskov (born 1985), Russian football player
Elena Guskova (born 1949), Russian historian 
Hanna Huskova (born 1992), Belarusian freestyle skier
Marie Hušková (born 1942), Czech mathematician
Oleksandr Huskov (born 1994), Ukrainian football player
Svetlana Guskova (born 1957), Moldovan runner

References

Russian-language surnames